Nguyễn Ðình Chi (born 20 January 1953) is a Vietnamese wrestler. He competed in the men's freestyle 68 kg at the 1980 Summer Olympics.

References

External links
 

1953 births
Living people
Vietnamese male sport wrestlers
Olympic wrestlers of Vietnam
Wrestlers at the 1980 Summer Olympics
Place of birth missing (living people)